Blair Peter Larsen (born 20 January 1969) is a former New Zealand rugby union player. He was a member of the New Zealand national side, the All Blacks, from 1992 to 1996, playing 40 matches including 17 internationals.

References

1969 births
Living people
New Zealand rugby union players
New Zealand international rugby union players
North Harbour rugby union players
Northland rugby union players
Chiefs (rugby union) players
Kobelco Kobe Steelers players
New Zealand expatriate rugby union players
New Zealand expatriate sportspeople in Japan
Expatriate rugby union players in Japan
Rugby union locks
Rugby union flankers
New Zealand rugby union coaches
People educated at Rosmini College
Rugby union players from Auckland
People from Takapuna